Christopher Whitesell is an American television soap opera writer. He has served as either co-head writer, associate head writer, or a breakdown writer on the shows he has worked. In April 2012, he was named co-head writer of Days of Our Lives with Gary Tomlin, replacing Marlene Clark McPherson and Darrell Ray Thomas who had been let go.

Biography
He is the son of Patricia and John Patrick "Jack" Whitesell. His brothers are the late film and television actor Sean Whitesell, Thomas Whitesell, talent agent Patrick Whitesell, college basketball coach James Whitesell, and director John Whitesell.

Positions held
Another World
Associate head writer: 1988–1991, 1995–1996

As the World Turns
Breakdown writer: 1987–1988 (hired by Douglas Marland), 2003–2005 (hired by Hogan Sheffer)
Co-head writer: May 25, 2005 – October 17, 2007 (with Jean Passanante & Leah Laiman)

Days of Our Lives
Associate head writer: 2000–2001
Co-head writer: October 13, 2008 – June 13, 2011 (with Dena Higley, (hired by Gary Tomlin)
Co-headwriter: August 17, 2012 – August 18, 2015 (with Gary Tomlin, (hired by Ken Corday)

General Hospital
Co-head writer: May – December 5, 1997
Associate head writer: 1997
Breakdown writer: November 20, 2015 – December 1, 2017

Guiding Light
Associate head writer: 1984–1986

One Life to Live
Co-head writer: 2001 – January 31, 2003
Associate head writer: 1993–1995 (hired by Michael Malone)

Sunset Beach
Co-head writer: January 8, 1998 – December 31, 1999 (with Meg Bennett: till October 8, 1998; then Margaret DePriest)

The Young and the Restless
Breakdown writer: June 21, 2011 – June 11, 2012

Awards and nominations
Daytime Emmy Awards

NOMINATIONS
(2006; Best Writing; As the World Turns)
(1995 & 2002; Best Writing; One Life to Live)
(1989; Best Writing; Another World)
(1985; Best Writing; Guiding Light)

WINS
(2004–2005; Best Writing; As the World Turns)
(1994; Best Writing; One Life to Live)
(1986; Best Writing; Guiding Light)

Writers Guild of America Award

NOMINATIONS
2005 season; As the World Turns
2001 season; Days of Our Lives
1997 & 1998 season; General Hospital
1997 season; Another World
1994 season; One Life to Live
1984 & 1985 season; Guiding Light

HW history

References

External links

CBS: ATWT
Procter & Gamble

Living people
American soap opera writers
People from Iowa Falls, Iowa
Year of birth missing (living people)
Whitesell family